Występ (The Gig) is a live album by the Polish rock/rapcore band Kazik Na Żywo. It was released on 21 September 2002 in Poland through S.P. Records on two CDs.

Track listing

Disc one

1, 15 - spoken skits

Disc two

Personnel
Kazik Staszewski - vocals, guitar, bass, virus
Adam Burzyński - guitar
Olaf Deriglasoff - guitar, bass, backing vocals, virus, sampler
Tomasz Goehs - drums
Michał Kwiatkowski - bass, guitar, backing vocals
Krzysztof Radzimski - guest vocals in 220V

References

2002 live albums
Kazik na Żywo albums